Bennett Saddle is the deep snow saddle between Mount Waesche and Mount Sidley, in the Executive Committee Range of Marie Byrd Land. It was named by the Advisory Committee on Antarctic Names for Gerard A. Bennett, traverse specialist at Byrd Station, a member of the Executive Committee Range Traverse (February 1959) and Marie Byrd Land Traverse (1959–60) that carried out surveys in this area.

References
 

Mountain passes of Antarctica
Landforms of Marie Byrd Land
Executive Committee Range